Happy Town is the third album by the American singer-songwriter Jill Sobule, released in 1997. The album contains the singles "Bitter" and "When My Ship Comes In" as well as "Half a Heart" and the satirical social commentary "Soldiers of Christ", where Sobule sings from the point of view of a Christian Conservative to illustrate the existence of homophobia in religion. The album sold 24,000 copies in the US within the first year of its release.

"Bitter" peaked at No. 74 on the Australian ARIA singles chart in June 1997. The album peaked at No. 83 on the Australian ARIA albums chart during the same month. Sobule was dropped by Atlantic after the release of Happy Town.

The album cover illustration, which initially featured a Prozac pill, was changed to show a pair of test tubes when Wal-Mart refused to carry the album in its stores. The company asserted that the original image promoted drug abuse.

Critical reception
The Spokesman-Review called the album "a bold step forward for a creatively expansive artist." Trouser Press called it "a record to respect rather than appreciate," writing that "many of the songs are fine, and she’s one of contemporary pop’s better observational songwriters, but the tone is unremittingly hostile." The Deseret News deemed it "fun, liberal, spunky and sarcastic." The Baltimore Sun wrote that "the title tune's shift from cheesy, low-key organ to bright, power-pop guitar make it easy to understand the difference between the dull old world and life in that new, prozac-ed 'Happy Town'."

Track listing
"Bitter" (Richard Barone, Sobule) – 3:30
"Happy Town" (Goldenberg, Sobule) – 3:46
"Barren Egg" (Eaton, Sobule) – 3:37
"Half a Heart" (DeMain, Sobule) – 3:47
"When My Ship Comes In" (Eaton, Marvin Gaye, Ivy Jo Hunter, Sobule, William Stevenson) – 3:50
"Clever" (Eaton, Sobule) – 3:18
"I'm So Happy" (Eaton, Sobule) – 2:43
"Little Guy" (Sobule) – 3:24
"Underachiever" (Sobule) – 3:42
"Love Is Never Equal" (Eaton, Sobule) – 3:15
"Soldiers of Christ" (Eaton, Sobule) – 3:20
"Attic" (Sobule) – 2:10
"Sold My Soul" (Eaton, Sobule) – 3:35
"Super 8" (Galdston, Sobule) – 2:26

Personnel

Musicians
Jill Sobule – vocals, acoustic guitar, bass guitar, guitar, percussion, drums, keyboards, ebo, vibraphone
Sam Bacco – percussion
George Bradfute – electric guitar
Louis Brown – tuba, cornet
 Chris Carmichael – strings
Steve Earle – electric guitar, vocals
Robin Eaton – guitar
Phil Galdston – keyboards
Mark Goldenberg – guitar, keyboards, vocals
Mickey Grimm – percussion, drums
Jim Hoke – clarinet, flute, harmonica, autoharp, bass clarinet, soprano saxophone
Byron House – upright bass
Brad Jones – organ, bass guitar, piano, harmonium, keyboards, Moog synthesizer, vibraphone
Viktor Krauss – upright bass
Roger Moutenot – Moog synthesizer
Al Perkins – pedal steel
Ross Rice – bass guitar, piano, drums, harmonium, Wurlitzer

Production
Producers: Robin Eaton, Mark Goldenberg, Brad Jones
Engineers: Brad Jones, Dominick Maita, Elijah Shaw
Mixing: Roger Moutenot
Mixing assistants: Rich Cohan, Sandy Jenkins, Chris Stone
Programming: Mark Goldenberg
Photography: Annette Aurell
Arranger: Phil Galdston
Production Coordination: Barbara Moutenot
Cover design: Brad Talbott
Illustrations: Brad Talbott
Background vocals: Bob, Jim, Mary Ellen and Matthew Sobule

Charts

References

Jill Sobule albums
1997 albums
Atlantic Records albums
Albums produced by Brad Jones (musician)